De homine replegiando (literally "personal replevin") is a legal remedy used to liberate a person from unlawful detention on bail, "with a view to try the question of the validity of the law under which he is held in confinement."

It is the oldest common law freedom writ.

Procedure 
The writ is "of common right, and may be issued as of course." Once issued, a judicial order is directed to a sheriff or a deputy ordering the replevy of the prisoner in exchange for security that they will reappear for a proceeding challenging their detention.

Etymology 
The French word replegiando or “revendication” is derived from the Latin word replegiare meaning "pledge back."

References 

Common law legal terminology
Court orders